Munbilla is a rural town and locality in the Scenic Rim Region, Queensland, Australia.

Geography 
Warrill Creek forms the north-western boundary of the locality. The town is in the north-east of the locality.

Mooroo Ougee Lagoon is a perennial waterhole in the north of the locality.

History 
The suburb takes its name from the former Munbilla railway station, whose name was created in 1886 by the Queensland Railways Department using the Yuggera words mun (meaning much) and billa (meaning water) to mean a large lagoon.

The Fassifern railway line (Queensland's first branch railway line) opened from Ipswich to Harrisville on 10 July 1882. On 12 September 1887 the line was extended to Dugundan with Munbilla being served by Munbilla railway station on Macfarlane Road. The line closed in June 1964.

The Mount Edwards branch line branched off from the Fassifern line immediately south of the Munbilla railway station. The Mount Edwards line opened to Kalbar on 17 April 1916 and to Mount Edwards on 7 October 1922. The Mount Edwards line closed in 1960.

Education 
There are no schools in Munbilla. The nearest government primary schools are:

 Harrisville State School in Harrisville to the north
 Roadvale State School in Roadvale to the south-east
 Kalbar State School in Kalbar to the south
 Warrill View State School in Warrill View to the north-west
The nearest government secondary school is Boonah State High School in Boonah to the south.

References

External links 

 Town map of Munbilla, 1936

Scenic Rim Region
Towns in Queensland
Localities in Queensland